Davis School District is a school district serving Davis County, Utah, United States. Headquartered in the county seat of Farmington, it is the 61st largest school district in the United States and the 2nd largest school district in Utah with 72,987 students attending Davis schools as of 2019. It is located almost entirely within Davis County. Students attend elementary school from kindergarten to 6th grade, junior high from 7th grade-9th grade, and high school from 10th grade-12th grade.

History
In 2006, the Davis School District received recognition for having the nation's top graduation rate among the 100 largest school districts in the United States, according to a survey by the Manhattan Institute for Policy Research. Also in 2006, the superintendent, Dr. W. Bryan Bowles was awarded superintendent of the year in Utah. For the 2016-17 school year, Reid Newey moved from the Weber School District to become the superintendent of DSD.

In 2019 a Davis school bus driver closed the bus doors on the backpack of a boy, pinning him outside the bus and dragging him forward a couple hundred feet. His family sued the driver, alleging this was done intentionally to racially harass the boy, who was biracial. They pointed to previous instances of racial harassment by the driver and attempts at retaliation for reporting him. The district settled the suit for $62,500 and acknowledge the "racial assault".
An investigation by the United States Department of Justice followed. That investigation found that racial harassment was widespread in the school district and hundreds of complains were intentionally unaddressed.

Communities
Davis School District serves the following communities:

 Bountiful
 Centerville
 Clearfield
 Clinton
 Farmington
 Fruit Heights
 Hill Air Force Base
 Kaysville
 Layton
 North Salt Lake
 South Weber
 Sunset
 Syracuse
 West Bountiful
 West Point
 Woods Cross

Schools
The following schools are part of Davis School District:

Elementary schools

 Adams Elementary - Layton
 Adelaide Elementary - Bountiful
 Antelope Elementary - Clearfield
 Bluff Ridge Elementary - Syracuse
 Boulton Elementary - Bountiful
 Bountiful Elementary - Bountiful
 Buffalo Point Elementary - Syracuse
 H.C. Burton Elementary - Kaysville
 Canyon Creek Elementary - Farmington
 Centerville Elementary - Centerville
 Clinton Elementary - Clinton
 Columbia Elementary - Kaysville
 Cook Elementary - Syracuse
 Creekside Elementary - Kaysville
 Crestview Elementary - Layton
 Doxey Elementary - Sunset
 Eagle Bay Elementary - Farmington
 East Layton Elementary - Layton
 Ellison Park Elementary - Layton
 Endeavour Elementary - Kaysville
 Farmington Elementary - Farmington
 Foxboro Elementary - North Salt Lake
 Fremont Elementary - Sunset
 Heritage Elementary - Layton
 Hill Field Elementary - Clearfield
 Holbrook Elementary - Bountiful
 Holt Elementary - Clearfield
 Kay's Creek Elementary - Kaysville
 Kaysville Elementary - Kaysville
 King Elementary - Layton
 Knowlton Elementary - Farmington
 Lakeside Elementary - West Point
 Layton Elementary - Layton
 Lincoln Elementary - Layton
 Meadowbrook Elementary - Bountiful
 Morgan Elementary - Kaysville
 Mountain View Elementary - Layton
 Muir Elementary - Bountiful
 Oak Hills Elementary - Bountiful
 Odyssey Elementary - Woods Cross
 Orchard Elementary - North Salt Lake
 Parkside Elementary - Clinton
 Reading Elementary - Centerville
 Sand Springs Elementary - Layton
 Snow Horse Elementary - Kaysville
 South Clearfield Elementary - Clearfield
 South Weber Elementary - South Weber
 Stewart Elementary - Centerville
 Sunset Elementary - Sunset
 Syracuse Elementary - Syracuse
 Taylor Elementary - Centerville
 Tolman Elementary - Bountiful
 Vae View Elementary - Layton
 Valley View Elementary - Bountiful
 Wasatch Elementary - Clearfield
 Washington Elementary - Bountiful
 West Bountiful Elementary - West Bountiful
 West Clinton Elementary - Clinton
 West Point Elementary - West Point
 Whitesides Elementary - Layton
 Windridge Elementary - Kaysville
 Woods Cross Elementary - Woods Cross

Junior high schools

 Bountiful Junior High School - Bountiful
 Centennial Junior High School - Kaysville
 Centerville Junior High School - Centerville
 Central Davis Junior High School - Layton
 Fairfield Junior High School - Kaysville
 Farmington Junior High School - Farmington
 Kaysville Junior High School - Kaysville
 Legacy Junior High School - Layton
 Millcreek Junior High School - Bountiful
 Mueller Park Junior High School - Bountiful
 North Davis Junior High School - Clearfield
 North Layton Junior High School - Layton
 South Davis Junior High School - Bountiful
 Sunset Junior High School - Sunset
 Syracuse Junior High School - Syracuse
 Shoreline Junior High School - Layton
 West Point Junior High School - West Point

High schools

 Bountiful High School - Bountiful
 Clearfield High School - Clearfield
 Davis High School - Kaysville
 Farmington High School - Farmington
 Layton High School - Layton
 Northridge High School - Layton
 Syracuse High School - Syracuse
 Viewmont High School - Bountiful
 Woods Cross High School - Woods Cross

Special schools

 Family Enrichment Center - Kaysville
 Mountain High School - Kaysville
 Pioneer Adult Rehabilitation Center - Clearfield
 Renaissance Academy - Kaysville

See also

 List of the largest school districts in the United States by enrollment
 List of school districts in Utah

Notes

References

External links

 
 Davis Education Foundation
 DavisParents.org - Parent Advocacy Group

School districts in Utah
Education in Davis County, Utah